Warcha , is a village and one of the 51 Union Councils (administrative subdivisions) of Khushab District in the Punjab Province of Pakistan. It is located at 32°24'46N 71°57'57E Over 1 billion tonnes of salt reserves are present in Warcha salt mine.

References

Atta Muhammad Son of Gulsher taar khail (awan) Was the Famous political personality  he defeated Rustam Khan in Election and Now his Grand Son Malik Ashfaq Awan is the Main Celebrity Of Warcha Shareef

Union councils of Khushab District
Populated places in Khushab District